Hinkley may refer to:

 Hinkley (surname)
 Hinkley, California, a community in the United States
 Hinkley High School, a high school in Aurora, Colorado
 Hinkley Locomotive Works, a 19th-century steam locomotive manufacturer in Boston, Massachusetts
 Hinkley Point, a nuclear power station in Somerset, England

See also 
 Edmund Hinkly, an English Cricketer
 Hinckley (disambiguation)